Linda Denise Lavarch (born 27 November 1958, in Brisbane) is an Australian politician and solicitor. She was a Labor Party member of the Legislative Assembly of Queensland from 1997 to 2009, representing the district of Kurwongbah.

Political career
Lavarch was first elected to the seat of Kurwongbah, situated in Brisbane's northern suburbs, in a by-election on 24 May 1997. On 28 July 2005, Lavarch was appointed Queensland's Attorney-General and Minister for Justice—the first woman to hold a substantive role as Attorney-General in Queensland (Joan Sheldon had held the role in an interim capacity for seven days in 1996). Prior to being appointed Attorney-General, she held the position of parliamentary secretary to the Minister for Energy and Aboriginal and Minister for Torres Strait Islander Policy, John Mickel.

Lavarch pursued an active reform agenda as Attorney-General particularly focusing on community justice initiatives and the treatment of vulnerable people in the criminal justice system. She retired at the 2009 state election.

On 27 April 2016, Lavarch was announced as the Labor candidate for the federal seat of Dickson at the 2016 election, eventually losing to Immigration Minister, Peter Dutton. Her former husband, Michael, previously represented Dickson from 1993 to 1996.

Lavarch sought ALP preselection to run in Dickson again in the 2019 election but was defeated by Ali France, the daughter of her former parliamentary colleague Peter Lawlor.

Post politics
Lavarch currently chairs the Australian government's Not-For-Profit Sector Reform Council which provides advice to government on not-for-profit sector issues.

Lavarch was chair of the board for Screen Queensland from 2018 to 2022.

Personal life
She was formerly married to Michael Lavarch, who had served as an Attorney-General at the federal level from 1993 to 1996.

References

|-

                   

1958 births
Living people
Members of the Queensland Legislative Assembly
Attorneys-General of Queensland
Queensland University of Technology alumni
Academic staff of Queensland University of Technology
Australian solicitors
Australian Labor Party members of the Parliament of Queensland
21st-century Australian politicians
21st-century Australian women politicians
Women members of the Queensland Legislative Assembly